Ren Ci Hospital (Chinese: 仁慈医院) is one of the first few charity healthcare institutions in Singapore to provide affordable healthcare and rehabilitative services in Singapore. Established in 1994, Ren Ci Hospital currently has three facilities Ren Ci Community Hospital, Ren Ci @ Ang Mo Kio and Ren Ci @ Bukit Batok St. 52. Besides government subvention, Ren Ci Hospital also relies heavily on public support and donation.

The hospital's CEO Shi Ming Yi performed stunts to help the patients to raise funds in the annual charity programme on Channel U since the first charity programme started in 2003.

Ren Ci made headlines when the Ministry of Health (MOH) announced that the charity is being probed for 'possible irregularities in certain financial transactions'. An audit found that the charity had made interest-free loans amounting to a few million dollars to various companies since 1996. There were discrepancies between what the charity recorded it lent and what the companies involved recorded as having borrowed. In 2009, Ming Yi was convicted on four charges for misappropriating Ren Ci funds, making unauthorized loans and giving false information to the Commissioner for Charities. The Charity's Institute of Public Character (IPC) status was not renewed as a result of the outcome of the investigation. It regained its IPC status on 5 August 2008.

Mr Loh Kum Mow, a Singapore millionaire who died in December 2016 at the age of 89, divided his fortune in four. After his death he bequeathed large sums of money to the National Kidney Foundation (NKF), Thye Hua Kwan Moral Charities, Ren Ci Hospital and Bo Tien Welfare Services Society. Ren Ci Hospital received close to S$840,000.

References

External links
Official website
News article - IPC status suspended by MOH
News article - IPC status restored by MOH 

Hospitals in Singapore
Hospitals established in 1994